Bonhamtown is a section of Edison Township in Middlesex County, New Jersey, United States.

The area was named after Nicholas Bonham, a freeholder from the 17th century. Along with New Dover, New Durham, and Stelton it is one of the older historical communities established when the municipality was known as Raritan Township.

Bonhamtown is surrounded by several major roads, which include: Interstate 287, the New Jersey Turnpike, U.S. Route 1, Route 27, and Route 440.

The Bonhamtown Branch of Conrail Shared Assets Operations (CRCX) runs through the area from the Northeast Corridor to Raritan Center, site of the former Raritan Arsenal.

See also
List of neighborhoods in Edison, New Jersey

References

External links

Bonhamtown City-Data Profile
Bonhamtown Community Profile

Neighborhoods in Edison, New Jersey
Unincorporated communities in Middlesex County, New Jersey
Unincorporated communities in New Jersey